Gordon H. Peck (1857 – February 18, 1921) was an American manufacturer and politician from New York.

Life
Peck engaged in the manufacture of brick at Haverstraw. Later he also engaged in farming and the real estate business. On February 22, 1908, he married Katherine L. Maqueston (1881–1955).

Peck was a member of the New York State Assembly (Rockland Co.) in 1918, 1919, 1920 and 1921; and was Chairman of the Committee on Charitable and Religious Societies in 1921.

He died on February 18, 1921; and was buried at the Mount Repose Cemetery in Haverstraw.

Sources
 Married; PECK—MAQUESTON in NYT on February 24, 1908
 Assemblyman Gordon H. Peck in NYT on February 19, 1921
 Santa Barbara Cemetery transcriptions; "PECK, Katherine Maquiston"

External links
 

1857 births
1921 deaths
People from Haverstraw, New York
Republican Party members of the New York State Assembly